This article is about the particular significance of the year 1711 to Wales and its people.

Incumbents
Lord Lieutenant of North Wales (Lord Lieutenant of Anglesey, Caernarvonshire, Denbighshire, Flintshire, Merionethshire, Montgomeryshire) – Hugh Cholmondeley, 1st Earl of Cholmondeley
Lord Lieutenant of South Wales (Lord Lieutenant of Glamorgan, Brecknockshire, Cardiganshire, Carmarthenshire, Monmouthshire, Pembrokeshire, Radnorshire) – Thomas Herbert, 8th Earl of Pembroke

Bishop of Bangor – John Evans
Bishop of Llandaff – John Tyler
Bishop of St Asaph – William Fleetwood
Bishop of St Davids – Philip Bisse

Events
23 August - Baptist minister Rev Abel Morgan is seen off by his congregation at Rhydwilim prior to embarking for a future in America.
23 September - Christmas Samuel is ordained at the request of his congregation at Panteg.
unknown date
Thomas Durston begins printing Welsh language books at Shrewsbury.
Newtown Square Friends Meeting House is founded by Welsh immigrants in the Great Valley of Pennsylvania. 
Price Devereux, 9th Viscount Hereford, becomes Custos Rotulorum of Montgomeryshire.

Arts and literature

New books
Jonathan Edwards - A Vindication of the Doctrine of Original Sin from the exceptions of Dr. Daniel Whitby
William Jones - Analysis per quantitatum series, fluxiones ac differentias 
Y Llyfr Gweddi Gyffredin y Cydymaith Goreu: Yn y Tŷ a'r Stafell

Births
approximate date
Dafydd Jones, hymn-writer (died 1777)
Josiah Owen, Presbyterian minister and controversialist (died 1755)
Daniel Rowland, Methodist leader (died 1790)

Deaths
December - unnamed wife and son of Rev Abel Morgan (see Events), both of whom died on board ship during the voyage from Wales to Pennsylvania.

See also
1711 in Scotland

References

1710s in Wales
Years of the 18th century in Wales